Plant arithmetic is a form of plant cognition whereby plants appear to perform arithmetic operations – a form of number sense in plants.

Arithmetic by species

Venus flytrap

The Venus flytrap can count to two and five in order to trap and then digest its prey.

The Venus flytrap is a carnivorous plant that catches its prey with a trapping structure formed by the terminal portion of each of the plant's leaves, which is triggered by tiny hairs on their inner surfaces. When an insect or spider crawling along the leaves contacts a hair, the trap prepares to close, snapping shut only if a second contact occurs within approximately twenty seconds of the first strike. The requirement of redundant triggering in this mechanism serves as a safeguard against wasting energy by trapping objects with no nutritional value, and the plant will only begin digestion after five more stimuli to ensure it has caught a live bug worthy of consumption.

The mechanism is so highly specialized that it can distinguish between living prey and non-prey stimuli, such as falling raindrops; two trigger hairs must be touched in succession within 20 seconds of each other or one hair touched twice in rapid succession, whereupon the lobes of the trap will snap shut, typically in about one-tenth of a second.

Arabidopsis thaliana

Arabidopsis thaliana in effect performs division to control starch use at night.

Most plants accumulate starch by day, then metabolize it at a fixed rate during night time. However, if the onset of darkness is unusually early, Arabidopsis thaliana reduces its use of starch by an amount that effectively requires division. However, there are alternative explanations, such as feedback control by sensing the amount of soluble sugars left. As of 2015, open questions remain.

See also

References

Arithmetic
Arithmetic
Cognitive science
Ethology